Talkbiznow was a business networking site  Founded in 2008 and launched in August 2008, the site is a web-based business community and collaboration tool that provides business services for small businesses and professionals. Talkbiznow has been featured in the San Francisco Chronicle, Design Week, Sky News, The Financial Times, The Guardian, Times Online, Forbes, Fox Business Network, and The Daily Telegraph.

References

External links
Talkbiznow Web Site
BBC Click Kate Russell on the Internet
PaidContent Interview Interview: Martin Warner, CEO, Talkbiznow:’Not too late for another business .net

Defunct social networking services
Internet properties established in 2008